In statistics, an empirical distribution function (commonly also called an empirical Cumulative Distribution Function, eCDF) is the distribution function associated with the empirical measure of a sample. Its value at any specified value of the measured variable is the fraction of observations of the measured variable that are less than or equal to the specified value.

The empirical distribution function is an estimate of the cumulative distribution function that generated the points in the sample. It converges with probability 1 to that underlying distribution, according to the Glivenko–Cantelli theorem.  A number of results exist to quantify the rate of convergence of the empirical distribution function to the underlying cumulative distribution function.

Definition 
Let  be independent, identically distributed real random variables with the common cumulative distribution function . Then the empirical distribution function is defined as

where  is the indicator of event . For a fixed , the indicator  is a Bernoulli random variable with parameter ; hence  is a binomial random variable with mean  and variance .

However, in some textbooks, the definition is given as

Mean

The mean of the empirical distribution is an unbiased estimator of the mean of the population distribution.

which is more commonly denoted

Variance

The variance of the empirical distribution times  is an unbiased estimator of the variance of the population distribution, for any distribution of X that has a finite variance.

Mean squared error

The mean squared error for the empirical distribution is as follows.

Where  is an estimator and  an unknown parameter

Quantiles

If  is not an integer, then the -th quantile is unique and is equal to 

If   is an integer, then the -th quantile is not unique and is any real number  such that

Empirical median

If  is odd, then the empirical median is the number

If  is even, then the empirical median is the number

Asymptotic properties 
Since the ratio  approaches 1 as  goes to infinity, the asymptotic properties of the two definitions that are given above are the same.

 
thus the estimator  is consistent. This expression asserts the pointwise convergence of the empirical distribution function to the true cumulative distribution function. There is a stronger result, called the Glivenko–Cantelli theorem, which states that the convergence in fact happens uniformly over :
 
The sup-norm in this expression is called the Kolmogorov–Smirnov statistic for testing the goodness-of-fit between the empirical distribution  and the assumed true cumulative distribution function . Other norm functions may be reasonably used here instead of the sup-norm. For example, the L2-norm gives rise to the Cramér–von Mises statistic.

The asymptotic distribution can be further characterized in several different ways. First, the  central limit theorem states that pointwise,  has asymptotically normal distribution with the standard  rate of convergence:
 
The covariance structure of this Gaussian process is
 
The uniform rate of convergence in Donsker’s theorem can be quantified by the result known as the Hungarian embedding:
 

Alternatively, the rate of convergence of  can also be quantified in terms of the asymptotic behavior of the sup-norm of this expression. Number of results exist in this venue, for example the Dvoretzky–Kiefer–Wolfowitz inequality provides bound on the tail probabilities of :
 

Another result, which follows from the law of the iterated logarithm, is that 
 
and

Confidence intervals 

As per Dvoretzky–Kiefer–Wolfowitz inequality the interval that contains the true CDF, with probability  is specified as

As per the above bounds, we can plot the Empirical CDF, CDF and Confidence intervals for different distributions by using any one of the Statistical implementations. Following is the syntax from Statsmodel for plotting empirical distribution.

Statistical implementation 
A non-exhaustive list of software implementations of Empirical Distribution function includes:

 In R software, we compute an empirical cumulative distribution function, with several methods for plotting, printing and computing with such an “ecdf” object.
 In MATLAB we can use Empirical cumulative distribution function (cdf) plot
 jmp from SAS, the CDF plot creates a plot of the empirical cumulative distribution function. 
 Minitab, create an Empirical CDF
 Mathwave, we can fit probability distribution to our data
 Dataplot, we can plot Empirical CDF plot
 Scipy, we can use scipy.stats.ecdf
 Statsmodels, we can use statsmodels.distributions.empirical_distribution.ECDF
 Matplotlib, we can use histograms to plot a cumulative distribution
 Seaborn, using the seaborn.ecdfplot function
Plotly, using the plotly.express.ecdf function
 Excel, we can plot Empirical CDF plot

See also 
 Càdlàg functions
 Count data
 Distribution fitting
 Dvoretzky–Kiefer–Wolfowitz inequality
 Empirical probability
 Empirical process
 Estimating quantiles from a sample
 Frequency (statistics)
 Kaplan–Meier estimator for censored processes
 Survival function
 Q–Q plot

References

Further reading

External links 
 

Nonparametric statistics
Empirical process